Gordon William Lee (December 12, 1894 – November 12, 1964) was a provincial politician from Alberta, Canada. He served as a member of the Legislative Assembly of Alberta from 1940 to 1952, sitting with the Social Credit caucus in government.

References

Alberta Social Credit Party MLAs
1964 deaths
1894 births
People from Athabasca County